Bush Mwale (born November 7, 1993) is a Kenyan rugby sevens player. He was named in the squad for the Wellington and Las Vegas Sevens of the 2014–15 Sevens World Series.

Mwale missed out on selection for the 2016 Las Vegas and Vancouver sevens tournaments because of a knee injury.

References

External links 
 

1993 births
Living people
Rugby sevens players at the 2016 Summer Olympics
Olympic rugby sevens players of Kenya
Kenya international rugby sevens players
Male rugby sevens players
Kenyan rugby union players
People from Nyeri County
Rugby sevens players at the 2022 Commonwealth Games